Aethes pardaliana is a moth of the family Tortricidae. It was described by Kennel in 1899. It is found in Turkmenistan, northern Iran, eastern Afghanistan and China (Xinjiang).

References

External links

pardaliana
Moths described in 1899
Moths of Asia
Taxa named by Julius von Kennel